Dita Rozenberga (born 22 December 1992) is a Latvian basketball player who was a member of TTT Rīga and the Latvian national team.

She participated at the 2018 FIBA Women's Basketball World Cup.

References

External links

1992 births
Living people
Latvian expatriate basketball people in Belgium
Latvian expatriate basketball people in Italy
Latvian expatriate basketball people in Poland
Latvian women's basketball players
People from Tukums
Small forwards